Theocracy is an American Christian progressive power metal band founded in 2002 by Matt Smith of Athens, Georgia. They have released four albums and multiple Christmas singles.

Background 
The group started as a one-man project with all the instruments and vocals on the debut album Theocracy performed by Smith.  Musically, the band mixes the power metal style of Edguy, Iced Earth, and Helloween with progressive influences from bands such as Dream Theater, Symphony X, Kansas and Rush.

The group performed at the ProgPower USA VII festival Pre-Party in Atlanta, Georgia. Live performances from the show of the songs "The Serpent's Kiss" and "Mountain" were included on the ProgPower VII DVD.

The band's self-titled album was released on January 1, 2003 by MetalAges Records. All instruments were played by Matt Smith. The album had been out of print for several years, and fans have asked for a re-issue. In order to improve upon the drum machine and amateur production of the original release without losing the charm of the recordings, Theocracy drummer Shawn Benson recorded drums on all tracks, while nothing else was re-recorded. Smith completely re-mixed the album, with the mastering handled by Mika Jussila, and on November 19, 2013, Ulterium Records re-released it.

Their second album, Mirror of Souls, was Theocracy's first album as a full band.  It was released on November 21, 2008 through Sweden's Ulterium Records and on November 26, 2008 in Japan by Soundholic Records.  The Japanese version contains the bonus track "Wages of Sin." The North American edition was released December 9, 2008. A picture disc LP was released through the record label's web store containing "Mirror of Souls," "Laying the Demon to Rest," "Absolution Day," and "The Wages of Sin." This LP was limited to 250 copies worldwide.

As the World Bleeds, was released on November 21, 2011 in North America and on November 25, 2011 in Europe. After releasing their new album, Theocracy released their first official music video from the new album, entitled "Hide in the Fairytale" on September 5, 2012.
The band embarked on a European tour to promote the remastered re-release of the self-titled album in November 2013. The tour consisted of smaller venue shows as well as larger festivals including Brainstorm Festival in The Netherlands, Blast of Eternity, and Rock Without Limits in Germany, and Maata Näkyvissä Festival in Finland. Joshua Street filled in for drummer Shawn Benson for this tour. 

On October 28, 2016, they released their fourth studio album, Ghost Ship, through Ulterium Records. It includes their second official music video for the album's title track filmed in Atlanta, along with lyric videos for "Wishing Well" and "Easter".

Band members 
Current members

Matt Smith – lead vocals (2002–present), keyboards (2002–2008), lead guitar, bass (2002–2009)
Jonathan Hinds – rhythm guitar, backing vocals, keyboards (2006–present)
Jared Oldham – bass, backing vocals (2009–present)
Ernie Topran – drums (2016–present)

Former members

Seth Filkins – bass, backing vocals
Josh Sloan – bass, backing vocals
Patrick Parris – bass, backing vocals
Shawn Benson – drums (2005–2014)
Patrick Nickell – drums (2014–2015)
Val Allen Wood – lead guitar, backing vocals (2009–2020)

Timeline

Discography
 Theocracy (2003)
 Mirror of Souls (2008)
 As the World Bleeds (2011)
 Ghost Ship (2016)

Christmas
Starting in 2003, the band has recorded and released one Christmas-themed song for free download to all members of their "Club of Souls" fan group per year, located on their official website, excluding 2013 and 2015. In 2013, Matt Smith instead dedicated his efforts to the Collide & Spark charity special, released as Project Aegis. In 2015, Theocracy instead were working on a new album, therefore did not have any time to record a new Christmas song.

2003-2006 (released in 2011): "Christmas Medley"
2004: "Little Drummer Boy"
2005: "Deck the Joy (To the Halls)"
2006: "Christmas Medley" (2006 Remix)
2007: "O Come, O Come, Emmanuel"
2008: "Rudolph vs. Frosty"
2009: "Angels from the Realms of Glory"
2010: "All I Want for Christmas"
2011: "Christmas Medley" (2011 Remix)
2012: "Wynter Fever"
2014: "Night of Silence"
2019: "Snowglobe"

References

External links
 

American Christian metal musical groups
Heavy metal musical groups from Georgia (U.S. state)
Musical groups established in 2002
American power metal musical groups
American progressive metal musical groups
2002 establishments in Georgia (U.S. state)